Ance Parish is an administrative territorial entity of the Ventspils Municipality, Latvia. The parish has a population of 712 (as of 1/07/2010) and covers an area of 397.78 km2.

Villages of Ance Parish 
 Ance
 Irbene
 Jorniņi
 Kārļmuiža
 Lonaste
 Ostupciems
 Rinda
 Silciems
 Virpe

Parishes of Latvia
Ventspils Municipality